Sir Timothy Hugh Francis Raison (3 November 1929 – 3 November 2011) was a British Conservative politician.

Early life and education
The son of publisher and editor Maxwell Raison, general manager of Picture Post, and his wife Celia, Raison was educated, through being a scholarship boy, at two independent schools: at Dragon School in Oxford, where he became Head of School. From there he got a scholarship to Eton College, then to Christ Church, Oxford, to which he also attained a scholarship.

Career
Raison began his career as a journalist, first working on Picture Post, then New Scientist.  Whilst at New Scientist he also edited Crossbow, journal of the Bow Group (a centre-right group within the Conservative Party).

According to Christopher Chataway, it was Raison, then still a journalist, who first came up with the idea of a World Refugee Year in 1958: 'It came from Tim Raison, who was a friend of mine and, like me, wanted to be a Conservative member of parliament ... He floated the idea past me and I thought it was terrific. He, I and two other journalists, Trevor Philpott and Colin Jones, wrote an article [in the Spring 1958 edition of Crossbow entitled “A Plan to Save the Refugees”] which was the start of the idea'.

In 1960 Raison received The Nansen Refugee Award, which is given annually by the United Nations High Commissioner for Refugees in recognition of outstanding service to the cause of refugees. He co-founded and edited the social science magazine New Society from 1962 until 1968 and was MP for Aylesbury from 1970 until his retirement in 1992. He served as a junior Education and Science Minister (1973–1974).

Raison served as a Home Office minister from 1979 to 1983, under then Home Secretary William Whitelaw, (later hereditary peer Viscount Whitelaw). He then served as Minister for Overseas Development (1983–1986).

In 1956 Raison married violin teacher Veldes Julia, daughter of John Arthur Pepys Charrington, of Netherton, Hurstbourne Tarrant, Hampshire, president of the Charrington Brewery and Master of the Worshipful Company of Brewers in 1952, of that landed gentry family of Cherry Orchard, Shaftesbury, Dorset; they had a son, Paul Raison, and three daughters.

Honours
 He was made a Member of Her Majesty's Most Honourable Privy Council in the 1982 New Years Honours List.
 He was knighted on 31 December 1990.

References

Further reading
Times Guide to the House of Commons, 1987 and 1992 editions.

 

1929 births
2011 deaths
Alumni of Christ Church, Oxford
Conservative Party (UK) MPs for English constituencies
Knights Bachelor
Members of the Bow Group
Members of the Privy Council of the United Kingdom
People educated at The Dragon School
Politicians awarded knighthoods
UK MPs 1970–1974
UK MPs 1974
UK MPs 1974–1979
UK MPs 1979–1983
UK MPs 1983–1987
UK MPs 1987–1992
Nansen Refugee Award laureates